A wiper seal is an axial seal that creates a seal while allowing a reciprocating shaft to pass through the seal's inner bore.  Wiper seals are often used for fluid containment and to prevent dirt from entering a reciprocating shaft mechanism.

Wiper seals are typically used on hydraulic and pneumatic cylinders, as well as telescopic suspension forks for motorcycles and bicycles.

See also
 Gland (engineering)
 Stuffing box

Seals (mechanical)